The High Speed Rail (London – West Midlands) Act 2017 is an Act of Parliament in the United Kingdom which authorises the construction of Phase One of High Speed 2, a high-speed railway between London and Birmingham. The Act was introduced to Parliament as a Hybrid Bill on 25 November 2013, and received Royal Assent on 23 February 2017.

Committee
The High Speed Rail (London - West Midlands) Bill Select Committee was a select committee of the House of Lords in the Parliament of the United Kingdom. The Committee was established in 2016 with a remit to provide persons and bodies directly affected by the Act the opportunity to object to specific provisions of the bill.

Membership 
As of 31 March 2019, the members of the committee are as follows:

References 

High Speed 2
United Kingdom Acts of Parliament 2017
Railway Acts